Hélène Ryckmans (born 20 May 1959) is a Belgian politician. She is the President of Ecolo-Groen group in the Senate of Belgium.

References 

Living people

1959 births
Université catholique de Louvain alumni
Members of the Senate (Belgium)
Women members of the Senate (Belgium)
21st-century Belgian women politicians
21st-century Belgian politicians
Belgian senators of the 57th legislature
Belgian environmentalists
Members of the Parliament of Wallonia
Members of the Parliament of the French Community